Ballysaggart is a village in County Waterford, Ireland.

Amenities
It has a Catholic church, public house, shop, garage and petrol filling station as well as a GAA playing field and civic amenity site.

Access
The village is situated approximately 8 kilometres from Lismore and 25 kilometres from Fermoy. Some maps may refer to the area as Logleagh.

See also 
 Ballysaggart GAA

References 

Geography of County Waterford
Towns and villages in County Waterford